American Campus Communities, Inc. (ACC) is the largest developer, owner and manager of student housing communities in the United States. It is headquartered in Bee Cave, Texas, with an Austin postal address.

Co-founded in 1993 by CEO Bill Bayless, the company works with universities to develop, manage and finance on-campus communities. As of March 31, 2021, the company owned 166 student housing properties with approximately 111,900 beds, including its owned and third-party managed properties. ACC's total managed portfolio consists of 207 properties with approximately 142,400 beds.

History
From 1993 to 2003, the company partnered with SUNY system, the University of California System, and the Texas A&M University System to develop and manage student housing.

In 1996, Prairie View A&M University became the company's first university partner with the development of on campus, University Village. ACC developed housing for more than 2,000 students over the next two years.

In 1997, Bayless bought out his partners and in 1999, ACC developed its first off-campus residence, the Callaway House College Station at Texas A&M University for first‑year students.

In 2004, ACC became a public company via an initial public offering on the New York Stock Exchange, becoming the first publicly traded student housing company in the United States.

In 2005, the company worked with Arizona State University (ASU) on the Vista del Sol community, to pioneer the American Campus Equity program, an ownership model for on-campus student housing. With ACE, ACC brings equity to a project and serves as the university's financial, development and operating partner. In 2008, the company acquired the student housing division of GMH Communities Trust in a $1.4 billion transaction, doubling the size of the company.

In 2011, the company received $132 million contract to build a 1,008-bed student housing complex at Northern Illinois University. In 2013, ACC entered the Ivy League with Princeton's Merwick Stanworth faculty and staff housing community was its first project at an Ivy League university. It later expanded its partnership to develop and manage Princeton graduate student housing.

ASU's Manzanita Hall, became ACC's first redevelopment, reconfiguring the dilapidated 1960s high rise into a modern layout that promotes academic performance, collaboration and community. In 2016, ACC broke ground on its 100th development, U Club Sunnyside at WVU, CEO Bill Bayless’ alma mater. In 2017, ASU opened the Tooker House, the largest engineering residential college. This marked the sixth phase of the ASU partnership and 33rd LEED certified building.

In 2018, ACC began construction on an approximately $615 million residential community for participants of the Disney College program, now known as Disney Internships & Programs, through an American Campus Equity translation. In 2019, American Campus Communities joined Northeastern University and the city of Boston to open the 20-story residential tower, LightView, as part of the “Housing A Changing City: Boston 2030” initiative to improve the quality and quantity of housing for students attending Boston institutions of higher education.

In 2020, ACC collaborated with RB, the makers of Lysol, to set a formalized approach to cleanliness and disinfection at its student housing communities in response to the COVID-19 pandemic.

On April 19, 2022, ACC announced that it was acquired by The Blackstone Group for $12.8 billion and would be going private (shareholders will be paid $65.47 cash per share). The acquisition was completed in August 2022.

Major milestones 
 First publicly traded campus dorm REIT  
 Pioneered on-campus equity transaction structure (ACE) 
 Achieved Investment Grade Rating from Moody's and Standard & Poor's 
 CEO Bill Bayless was the Regional Winner of the Ernst and Young Entrepreneur of the Year award, and was subsequently named as a National Finalist (2007) 
 National Association of Home Builders (2013) Development Firm of the Year 
 Forbes “America's 100 Most Trustworthy” companies list (2012 & 2013) 
 In 2015, CEO Bill Bayless was featured by Commercial Property Executive as one of commercial real estate's Most Innovative Executives 
 Texas Monthly magazine named American Campus Communities one of the “Best Companies to Work For” on three separate occasions 
 Student Housing Business 5 INNOVATOR Awards (2016) 
 Student Housing Business 8 INNOVATOR Awards (2015) 
 Texan by Nature 20 (TxN20) Honoree, an official ranking of the Top 20 Texas-based companies leading conservation and sustainability in 2019 and 2020 
 National Association of Home Builders Pillars of the Industry Award: Best in Green Market Rate Multifamily Community for Plaza Verde at University of California, Irvine in 2019 
 Great Place to Work Certification based on employees’ feedback on the Trust Index™ Survey administered by Great Place to Work for 2020 
 Globe St. CRE Best Bosses Awarded to CEO Bill Bayless in 2020

Partnerships 
American Campus Communities and the mental health non profit, Hi, How Are You Project, aim to tackle issues of mental health among U.S. college students through a residence life training and awareness program at more than 70 universities across the country.

References

External links

1993 establishments in Texas
Financial services companies established in 1993
Real estate companies established in 1993
American companies established in 1993
Companies based in Texas
Companies formerly listed on the New York Stock Exchange
Real estate investment trusts of the United States
University and college dormitories in the United States
2022 mergers and acquisitions